The Midas Touch is a 1940 British thriller film directed by David MacDonald and starring Barry K. Barnes, Judy Kelly, Frank Cellier and Bertha Belmore. It is an adaptation of the 1938 novel of the same title by Margaret Kennedy.

It was made as a second feature at Teddington Studios by Warner Brothers. The film's sets were designed by Norman G. Arnold.

Cast
 Barry K. Barnes as Evan Jones
 Judy Kelly as Lydia Brenton
 Frank Cellier as Corris Morgan
 Bertha Belmore as Mrs Carter-Blake
 Eileen Erskine as Rosalie
 Philip Friend as David Morgan
 Scott Harrold as Harkness
 Iris Hoey as Ellie Morgan
 Anna Konstam as Mamie
 Evelyn Roberts as Major Arnold

References

Bibliography
 Chibnall, Steve & McFarlane, Brian. The British 'B' Film. Palgrave MacMillan, 2009.
 Goble, Alan. The Complete Index to Literary Sources in Film. Walter de Gruyter, 1999.

External links
 

1940 films
1940s thriller films
British thriller films
Films shot at Teddington Studios
Warner Bros. films
Films set in England
Films based on British novels
British black-and-white films
Films produced by Samuel Sax
1940s English-language films
1940s British films